Carson Wayne Newton (born April 3, 1942) is an American singer and actor. One of the most popular singers in the nation from the mid-to-late 20th-century, Newton remains one of the best-known entertainers in Las Vegas. He is known by the nicknames The Midnight Idol, Mr. Las Vegas and Mr. Entertainment.

As a teenager, Newton first performed in Las Vegas in the late 1950s and was mentored by some of the nation's biggest artists including Frank Sinatra, Bobby Darin and Elvis Presley. In 1963, he achieved headliner status at the Flamingo, a casino hotel in Las Vegas, and soon became one of the city's most popular performers. The Washington Post describes Newton as "America's number one night club act" and at his peak being more prominent in Las Vegas than both Sinatra and Presley. Newton is the highest-grossing entertainer in Las Vegas history. Throughout his career, Newton has appeared in a number of movies and television shows.

His well known songs include "Danke Schoen" (1963), "Summer Wind" (1965), "Red Roses for a Blue Lady" (1965), "Daddy, Don't You Walk So Fast" (1972) and "Years" (1980). "Danke Schoen" is Newton's signature song and was notably used in the 1986 movie Ferris Bueller's Day Off.

Early years
Newton was born Carson Wayne Newton in either Roanoke or Norfolk, Virginia to Patrick Newton (1915-1990), an auto mechanic, and his wife, Evelyn Marie Smith (1921–1985). He is of English, Irish, Scottish, Welsh and German ancestry. He believes he has some Native American ancestry (specifically, that his mother had some distant Cherokee and his father Powhatan heritage), but is not claimed or recognized by any tribe. His father served in the U.S. Navy during World War II, Newton spent his early years in Fredericksburg, Virginia, learning the piano, guitar, and steel guitar at age six. He performed in a local music radio show, playing steel guitar and singing country music, before school. On the weekends, he performed in a traveling road show of the Grand Ole Opry. 

While he was a child, his family moved to near Newark, Ohio. He began singing in local clubs, theaters, and fairs with his older brother, Jerry. Due to Newton's severe asthma, his family moved to Phoenix in 1952, at his doctor's suggestion. Soon after arriving in Phoenix, the brothers performed in a local television talent show Lew King Rangers and won. A a result, the owner of KOOL-TV, Tom Chauncey, who also televised the talent show, gave the brothers their own television show, Rascals in Rhythm and served as a mentor to them. The brothers, as the Rascals in Rhythm, appeared with the Grand Ole Opry roadshows and on ABC-TV's Ozark Jubilee; and performed in front of then-president Dwight D. Eisenhower and auditioned unsuccessfully for Ted Mack's Original Amateur Hour.

Newton attended North High School where he was the Sophomore Class President. He was also a member of the Reserve Officers' Training Corps, an officer-training program for training commissioned officers of the United States Armed Forces. In the spring of 1958, near the end of his junior year of high school, a Las Vegas booking agent saw the two Newton brothers performing on their local TV show and took them back for an audition. Impressed with their audition, the booking agent signed Newton, then-age 15, and his brother, as part of a two-week contract to perform in Las Vegas at the Flamingo. On closing night, Newton, and his brother, were offered a one-year contract to continue performing in Las Vegas. To pursue his music career, Newton left North High School just before finishing his junior year.

At age 18, Newton intended to join the US military, but because of his asthma, he was given a 1-Y rejection meaning he was only qualified to serve during the event of a major emergency. Instead, Newton volunteered his time performing shows for troops overseas.

Career as an entertainer

Early career

Wayne Newton, and his brother, performed at The Flamingo for five years doing six shows for six days a week. Newton credits his ability to base his performances on what the crowd wanted to hear for his early success in Las Vegas. In 1962, Newton performed the Irish folksong Danny Boy for Jackie Gleason in Phoenix. Impressed by Newton's performance, Gleason told Newton "don’t go on any other television show before you go on mine." On September 29, 1962, the brothers first performed on The Jackie Gleason Show. Over the next two years, Newton would perform on Gleason's show 12 times, which was his first appearance on national television. In the early to mid-1960s, Newton also acted and sang as "Andy", the baby-faced Ponderosa ranchhand, on the classic western TV series, Bonanza. During the filming of Bonanza, Newton first met Elvis Presley (who was filming another show on the same set) and they went on to become good friends. 

In 1962, Jackie Gleason organized an engagement between Newton and the Copacabana. There Newton first met Bobby Darin. Darin, who was impressed by Newton, agreed to produce Newton's records. By 1963, Newton had been signed to Capitol Records, and his first album was released on the label. Newton's hit song "Danke Schoen" was originally written for Darin to sing. However, Darin was intent on Newton having a hit song of his own and gave it to him. "Danke Schoen" went on to reach No. 13 on the Hot 100.

Many other prominent entertainment icons such as Lucille Ball, Danny Thomas, George Burns, and Jack Benny lent Newton their support. For example, after Benny saw Newton performing at a nightclub in Sydney, Australia, he hired him to perform an opening act for a booking he had at Harrah's Reno. Benny then hired Newton as an opening act for his comedy show in Las Vegas and to perform on The Jack Benny Program, which Newton did for five years. After his job with Benny ended, Newton was offered a job to open for another comic at the Flamingo, but Newton asked for, and was given, a headline act in 1963.  In 1965, Newton performed on The Lucy Show as a country boy singing to animals. Impressed with Newton's performance, CBS offered Newton his own TV show around this character. However, Newton declined the offer, at the urging of Lucille Ball, who told Newton unless "you want to be this country boy the rest of your life, turn this series down..." 

Newton was known for his distinctive high-pitched voice, which stayed with him for most of his career, although his voice did lower somewhat in the 1970s and 1980s. It was in the 1970s that Newton began focusing on primarily performing in Las Vegas.

Mr. Las Vegas

Following the death of Elvis Presley and the aging of many members of the Rat Pack, Newton emerged as the biggest entertainer in Las Vegas. In the 1970s, Newton performed primarily at the Desert Inn, The Frontier and Sands Hotel and Casino. Newton holds the record for total crowd counts during his peak. 

Esquire described Newton as "the biggest money-maker in the history of Vegas. Nobody has drawn like that week in, week out. Not Elvis, not Sinatra. There’s just no comparison." Newton's shows were especially popular in Las Vegas because of their long length - often lasting up to three hours - which stood out in comparison to the short length of many headliner's shows at the time in Las Vegas. 

In 1972, his recording of "Daddy, Don't You Walk So Fast" sold more than one million copies and was awarded a gold disc by the R.I.A.A. in July 1972. The song peaked at No. 4 in the United States and No. 1 in Australia and Canada, while the album of the same name peaked at No. 25 on the album charts.

In 1975, Newton was featured in the Glen Campbell Live in London, a TV special for the BBC. They sang three songs together.

From 1980 through 1982, The Beach Boys and The Grass Roots performed Independence Day concerts on the National Mall in Washington, D.C., attracting large crowds. However, in April 1983, James G. Watt, President Ronald Reagan's Secretary of the Interior, banned Independence Day concerts on the Mall by such groups. Watt said that "rock bands" that had performed on the Mall on Independence Day in 1981 and 1982 had encouraged drug use and alcoholism and had attracted "the wrong element", who would mug individuals and families attending any similar events in the future.  Watt then announced that Newton, a friend and supporter of President Reagan and a contributor to Republican Party political campaigns, would perform at the Mall's 1983 Independence Day celebration. Newton entered the Independence Day stage on the Mall on July 4, 1983, to mostly cheering members of the audience, but some members booed.

On May 23, 1989, Newton's live stage show was broadcast as a pay-per-view event called Wayne Newton Live in Concert. Newton did not perform his trademark songs "Danke Schoen" or "Red Roses for a Blue Lady". However, he closed the show with a special finale of "MacArthur Park", which culminated with an onstage rainfall.

On December 12, 1992, Newton hit #1 on the Cashbox Pop and Country charts with an Elvis Presley-inspired song, "The Letter". Controversy swirled around this chart feat, as "The Letter" did not chart at all on Billboard's authoritative Hot 100 chart, Adult Contemporary chart or "Bubbling Under" chart. It did not make the Radio & Records chart either. This marked the first and only time in history that a record hit #1 on the Cashbox Top 100 chart, yet failed to chart on Billboard'''s Hot 100.

During the 1990s, Newton began performing at other casinos, as their headliner, including Bally's, Caesars Palace and MGM Grand Las Vegas. Newton performed his 25,000th solo show in Las Vegas in 1994. In 1999, Newton signed a 10-year deal with the Stardust, calling for Newton to perform there 40 weeks out of the year for six shows a week (in a showroom named after him). The "headliner-in-residence" deal was the first of its kind. In 2005, in preparation for the eventual demolition of the Stardust Casino, the deal was amicably terminated. His last show at the Stardust was on April 20, 2005. In his final performance at the Stardust, Newton sang nearly his entire repertoire and songs of other Vegas mainstays as well. During the summer of 2005, Newton began a 30-show stint that summer at the Las Vegas Hilton.

Later and current career

Going into the 2000s, Newton continued to perform shows in Las Vegas, but also took a larger role serving as the face of Las Vegas.

In January 2005, Newton started a reality television show on E! called The Entertainer. The winner got a spot in his act, plus a headlining act of their own for a year. During player introductions at the 2007 NBA All-Star Weekend in Las Vegas, Newton sang Presley's "Viva Las Vegas."

Newton was featured on the 2007 fall season of Dancing with the Stars partnered with two-time champion Cheryl Burke. He became the third contestant to be eliminated from the contest. During the taping (which takes place at CBS Television City), he also became the first guest on The Price Is Right, which tapes on the same lot, under host Drew Carey, who began adding guests to the show, especially to present prizes. Newton appeared after a trip to Las Vegas was shown.

Beginning October 14, 2009, Newton began performing his then newest show "Once Before I Go" at the Tropicana in Las Vegas. In 2010, Newton took a 5-year hiatus to spend time with his family and prepare his voice for later shows in Las Vegas. In 2016, Newton returned to the stage at Bally's Hotel in the form of a lounge show called "Up Close & Personal", a combination of live singing, playing some of the 13 self-taught instruments (having learned in the past to give his voice a rest when performing six shows a night at the Fremont Hotel), and showing movie and TV clips, of himself, on screen.

After performing more than 30,000 shows on the Las Vegas strip, Newton celebrated his 60th year on stage with a show entitled "Mr. Las Vegas" at Caesars Palace that ran from January through May in 2019. Referring to his 60th year on stage, Newton said "It's hard for me to articulate, much less think about it...I was here when Caesars (Palace) was built. This hotel for me has always represented the flagship of the Strip."

In June 2020, Newton was seen on television commercials in North America as a spokesperson for Caesars Entertainment to promote the reopening of Caesars Entertainment resorts during the COVID-19 pandemic.

During the 2022 NFL Draft, which was held in Las Vegas, Newton announced, alongside Hall of Fame running back Marcus Allen, the Las Vegas Raiders' third round pick selection of Dylan Parham from Memphis University.

Personal life

On June 1, 1968, Newton married Elaine Okamura; they divorced in 1985. They have one daughter, born in 1976. On April 9, 1994, Newton married Kathleen McCrone, a lawyer from North Olmsted, Ohio. The couple have one daughter, born in 2002.

Newton was floated as a potential candidate for United States Senate by Frank Fahrenkopf, the former Republican State Chairman of Nevada, but Newton declined to run. 

A street near the Harry Reid International Airport is named Wayne Newton Boulevard. Newton was elected to the Gaming Hall of Fame in 2000. In 2010, Newton testified in front of the Rules Committee of the Virginia House of Delegates where he appealed for the state to recognize the Patawomeck Indian Tribe of Virginia. Newton believes his father and grandfather have Patawomeck ancestry.

Arabian horse breeding
Newton has stated, "My two loves in life, from the time I can remember, were music and horses, and I couldn't decide which I loved more."  His Arabian horse breeding program, located at his Casa de Shenandoah ranch, is called Aramus Arabians, and has produced six generations of horses, breeding over 700 foals, with 96 champions .  Newton's first experience with horses was at his uncle's farm, where he visited frequently. He bought his first horse when he sold his bicycle and his parents' movie camera to buy a foal when he was a sixth-grader. Originally owning Thoroughbreds and American Quarter Horses, he "fell in love" with the Arabian breed via his ownership of the Champion stallion Aramus, after whom he named his horse ranch.  He first came to the attention of Arabian breeders in 1969 when he partnered with Tom Chauncey, an Arabian breeder and television station owner, to purchase the stallion Naborr from the estate of Anne McCormick. They paid $150,000, which at the time was the highest price ever paid for an Arabian horse at auction.  Shortly thereafter, Newton formed a partnership with other Arabian breeders to purchase Aramus, who was a son of Naborr. He became the sole owner of Aramus in 1972.

Newton was given the Arabian Horse Breeders' Alliance (AHBA) Lifetime Achievement Award in 2007 during the first Arabian Breeder's World Cup in Las Vegas.  He continues to be directly involved in management of his horses, planning the breeding program for his horses, determining which to keep and which to sell, and even assisting his ranch staff during foaling season. He was awarded the Arabian Professional and Amateur Horseman's Association Breeder of the Year award in 1996.

Charitable causes
Newton was featured in the production of "You Can't Say Love Enough" (1996), an all-star single, also featuring Dolly Parton, Heidi Newfield and several other artist-celebrities; this production served to raise funds for diabetes research. Concurrently, the Wayne Newton Research Grant awarded by the American Diabetes Association was created. It has been awarded to several researchers including Jose F. Caro and Peter J. Roach.

In 2001, Newton succeeded Bob Hope as chairman of the United Service Organizations Celebrity Circle, a nonprofit-charitable corporation that provides live entertainment to members of the United States Armed Forces and their families. Newton was the grand marshal of the 80th Annual Shenandoah Apple Blossom Festival in Winchester, Virginia from May 1–7, 2007. He canceled a sold-out show to join the Festival. In 2008, Newton received a Woodrow Wilson Award for Public Service. The Woodrow Wilson International Center for Scholars, a national memorial to President Wilson, commemorates "the ideals and concerns of Woodrow Wilson." The award honors leaders who have given back to their communities.

Finances and legal problems
From 1980 to 1982, Newton was part owner of the Aladdin Hotel, in a partnership that led to a number of lawsuits and a failed attempt by Newton to purchase the entire hotel in 1983.

In 1992, Newton filed for Chapter 11 bankruptcy to reorganize an estimated $20 million in debts, much of which was accumulated while suing NBC for libel; he claimed the network had reported that he partnered with the Mafia to buy the Aladdin. His bankruptcy declaration included a $341,000 Internal Revenue Service tax lien. By 1999, he was financially well off again.

In August 2005, the IRS filed a lawsuit against Newton alleging that he and his wife owed more than $1.8 million in taxes and penalties. One of Newton's tax lawyers disputed that, saying, "We believe the IRS owes him money."

In late 2009, officials at Oakland County International Airport in Waterford, Michigan, claimed Newton owed the airport more than $60,000 for unpaid parking fees, which they claimed he owed after having abandoned a $2 million Fokker F28 plane there more than three years before. The plane was originally flown in for renovations in 2005. After they were completed in 2007, the plane was moved to an outside parking area. The monthly parking fees were $5,000. An aircraft of this type needs to have its engines run at least once a month to retain its airworthiness. The plane has since been disassembled, transported, and reassembled on his estate grounds.

In February 2010, Bruton Smith sued Newton, claiming he was delinquent on a loan he had personally guaranteed, then bought from Bank of America. Smith sought foreclosure of Newton's Las Vegas ranch Casa de Shenandoah. That same month, Clark County sheriff's deputies were refused entry to Newton's ranch. The officers attempted to serve civil papers and seize property as part of a $501,388 judgment against Newton awarded to Monty Ward, his former personal pilot, but security personnel employed by Newton refused to accept the papers. Ward, who filed suit in 2006, won the judgment for past-due wages in January 2009.

Newton was enmeshed in another lawsuit over a stalled project to convert his 40-acre home into a museum. In this lawsuit, a developer claimed he purchased Newton's home and paid the singer $19.5 million, with the understanding that Newton would move out and allow the property to be converted into a museum. The developer claimed that he had invested $50 million on the project, but that Newton had failed to move out and had deliberately thwarted construction efforts, including by sexually harassing construction workers.  The case was set to go to trial in May 2013.

On December 17, 2012, U.S. Bankruptcy Court Judge Bruce Markell approved the sale of Wayne Newton's estate, Casa de Shenandoah, to be listed for sale by Nathan and Associates, a Las Vegas brokerage firm. Bankruptcy papers placed the value of the property at $50.8 million. The property remained on the market, until 2015, when Newton reached an accord with Lacy Harber, the businessman who owned 70% of the corporation that had purchased Casa de Shenandoah to turn it into a museum. Newton and his family moved back into the property, and in September 2015, after construction of a museum to house memorabilia, it was opened for public tours. On April 26, 2018, the property hosted its last public event before closing indefinitely for renovations.

Discography
Albums

 Danke Schoen (Capitol, 1963)
 Sings Hit Songs (Capitol, 1964)
 In Person! (Capitol, 1964)
 Red Roses for a Blue Lady (Capitol, 1965)
 Summer Wind (Capitol, 1965)
 The Old Rugged Cross (Capitol, 1966)
 Now! (Capitol, 1966)
 Songs for a Merry Christmas (Capitol, 1966)
 It's Only the Good Times (Capitol, 1967)
 Song of the Year – Wayne Newton Style (Capitol, 1967)
 Michelle (Capitol, 1967)
 Wow!: Live Hollywood Concert (Capitol, 1968)
 God Is Alive (Capitol, 1968)
 The Greatest! (Capitol, 1968)
 Somewhere My Love (Capitol, 1968)
 "Dreams of the Everyday Housewife" and "Town & Country" (MGM, 1968)
 One More Time (MGM, 1968)
 Walking on New Grass (MGM, 1968)
 Wayne Newton's Songs of Faith (MGM, 1968)
 Christmas Isn't Christmas Without You (MGM, 1968)
 Live at the Frontier, Las Vegas (MGM, 1969)
 Everything's in Love Today (MGM, 1969)
 The Long and Winding Road (Capitol, 1970)
 Merry Christmas to You (Capitol, 1970)
 How I Got This Way (Capitol, 1971)
 Daddy Don't You Walk So Fast (Chelsea, 1972)
 Can't You Hear the Song? (Chelsea, 1972)
 Only Believe (Word, 1972)
 While We're Still Young (Chelsea, 1973)
 Pour Me a Little More Wine (Chelsea, 1973)
 Just a Closer Walk (Word, 1973)
 Everybody Knows (RCA Camden, 1974)
 The Best of Wayne Newton Live (Chelsea, 1974)
 The Midnight Idol (Chelsea, 1975)
 Tomorrow (Chelsea, 1976)
 Christmas Everywhere (Chelsea, 1976)
 Change of Heart (20th Century Fox, 1978)
 Wayne Newton Live! (Musicor, 1978)
 She Believes in Me (Aries II, 1979)
 Night Eagle I (Aries II, 1979)
 Coming Home (Curb, 1989)
 The Best Of Wayne Newton Now (Curb, 1990)
 Moods & Moments (Curb, 1992)

Singles

Filmography
Film80 Steps to Jonah (1969) - Mark Jonah WintersRocky III - Himself (uncredited)North and South (1986) - Captain Thomas TurnerFerris Bueller's Day Off (1986) - Voice, archivalLicence to Kill (1989) - Professor Joe ButcherThe Adventures of Ford Fairlane (1990) - Julian GrendelThe Dark Backward (1991) - Jackie ChromeBest of the Best 2 (1993) - WeldonNight of the Running Man (1995) - August GurinoVegas Vacation (1997) - Wayne NewtonElvis meet Nixon (1997) - HimselfOcean's Eleven (2001) - Boxing Spectator (cameo)Who's Your Daddy? (2004) - Peter MackElvis Has Left the Building (2004) - Himself (cameo, uncredited)Smokin' Aces (2006) - Wayne Newton (cameo)The Hangover (2009) - Himself (cameo)Hoodwinked Too! Hood vs. Evil (2011) - Jimmy 10-Strings (voice)40 West  (2011) - Sankey (cameo)Getting Back to Zero (2013) - BruceSharknado: The 4th Awakens (2016) - HimselfPuppy Love (2021) - Marshall

Television American Bandstand (June 20, 1964) - Sings "Only You"The Jack Benny Program (December 4, 1964) - Sings two songs and plays multiple instrumentsThe Ed Sullivan Show (May 3, 1965) - Sings "Hello Dolly"The Ed Sullivan Show (October 10, 1965) Sings "Remember When"The Lucy Show (December 27, 1965) - Sings 4 songs in the half-hour episode: "Side By Side", "Bessie The Heifer", "You're Nobody till Somebody Loves You", and Danke SchoenBonanza (1966) - Plays the character "Andy Walker" in two episodes of the TV series The Ed Sullivan Show (April 13, 1966) - Sings "April Showers"The Danny Kaye Show (December 22, 1966) - Guest stars on Danny's Christmas show Here's Lucy (Season 1, Episode 9, November 25, 1968) - "Lucy sells Craig to Wayne Newton" Here's Lucy (Season 2, Episode 22, February 16, 1970) - "Lucy and Wayne Newton"Vega$ ("The Classic Connection", 1979)- Appears as Justin Marsh, a race car driver mixed up in crime and friend of Dan TannaVega$ ("Dead Ringer", 1981) - Appears as himself and hires Dan Tanna after receiving threatening phone calls that accuse him of being an imposterPimp My Ride ("Robert's Chevrolet Van", 1984) - Appears as himself on the MTV reality show North and South, Book II (1986) - Appears as CSA Capt. Thomas TurnerFull House ("Viva Las Joey", 1990) - Appears as himselfRoseanne ("Vegas, Vegas", 1991) - Appears as himself  L.A. Law (1991) - Plays the role of the opposing counsel Perfect Strangers ("Wayne Man", 1992) - Appears as himself; plot of the episode is for Balki to get tickets to Newton's sold-out concert Tales from the Crypt ("The Pit", 1994) - Plays the role of fight promoter, Wink BarnumThe Fresh Prince of Bel-Air  ("Viva Lost Wages", 1995) - Plays the role of the manager of a Las Vegas casinoAlly McBeal ("They Eat Horses, Don't They?", 1998) The Pretender ("Cold Dick", 2000) - Appears as himself My Wife and Kids  ("Fantasy Camp", 2004) - Appears as himself 7th Heaven ("Wayne's World", 2004) - Appears as himselfKingdom Hospital ("On the Third Day", 2004) - Plays the role of maintenance man, Jack HandlemannAccording To Jim ("Vegas Baby", 2003) - Appears as himselfLas Vegas ("Pros and Cons", 2003; "Meatball Montecito", 2006) - Appears as himselfThe Entertainer (2005) - Newton hosts the reality competition series hosted that aired on the E! network Dancing with the Stars (Season 5, 2007) - Appears as a contestant The Price is Right (Season 36, 2007) - Makes a guest appearance and participates for a contestant to win a trip to Las VegasCelebrity Family Feud (Season 1, 2008) - Appears as a contestantThe Amazing Race ("Amazing Grace, How Sweet the Sound", 2009) - Appears as himselfThe Apprentice ("One Of Us Will Win, But Not By Much", 2013)Who Wants to be a Millionaire (Season 15, 2015; Season 16, 2018) - Appeared as a celebrity guest and raised $10,000 for charity, in his case the USO46th Academy of Country Music Awards (2011) - Appeared as a member of Toby Keith's entourage as Keith performed the song Red Solo Cup The Bachelorette ("Week 5", 2018) - Guest appearance where he teaches Bachlorette contestants how to write a song and perform live in Las VegasAlways Late with Katie Nolan ("Advice for the Las Vegas Raiders", 2018) - Guest appearance where he speaks about the Las Vegas Raiders2022 NFL Draft (Day 2, 2022) - Announces the 90th overall selection for the RaidersHacks ("There Will Be Blood", 2022) - Guest appearance

Video gamesFallout: New Vegas'' (2010) - Serves as the voice of Mr. New Vegas, the DJ of Radio New Vegas, an in-game radio station

References

External links

 
 
 
 
 Newton rolling in dough, October 31, 1999

1942 births
20th-century American male actors
20th-century American singers
21st-century American male actors
21st-century American singers
American country singer-songwriters
American male singer-songwriters
American people of English descent
American people of German descent
American people of Irish descent
American people of Scottish descent
American people of Welsh descent
Ballad musicians
Capitol Records artists
Challenge Records artists
Chelsea Records artists
Living people
Male actors from Arizona
Male actors from Virginia
MGM Records artists
Word Records artists
Musicians from Las Vegas
People from Newark, Ohio
People from Roanoke, Virginia
People from the Las Vegas Valley
Nevada Republicans
Singer-songwriters from Virginia
Singer-songwriters from Ohio
Country musicians from Ohio
Arabian breeders and trainers
North High School (Phoenix, Arizona) alumni
20th-century American male singers
21st-century American male singers
Las Vegas shows
American people who self-identify as being of Native American descent
Singer-songwriters from Arizona
Singer-songwriters from Nevada
United Service Organizations entertainers